Olga Vassiljeva (born 28 October 1977) is an Estonian former competitive figure skater. She represented Estonia at the 1992 Winter Olympics in Albertville, placing 21st, and won ten national titles. Her highest placement at an ISU Championship was 15th, achieved at the 2003 European Championships.

Programs

Competitive highlights

References

External links
 
 Olga Vassiljeva at Tracings.net 

1977 births
Estonian female single skaters
Figure skaters from Tallinn
Estonian people of Russian descent
Living people